Stenodesmus is a genus of millipedes belonging to the family Xystodesmidae.

The species of this genus are found in Northern America.

Species:

Stenodesmus acuarius 
Stenodesmus mexicanus 
Stenodesmus serratus 
Stenodesmus simillimus 
Stenodesmus tuobitus

References

Xystodesmidae
Millipede genera